There are two species of gecko named large forest gecko:
 Gekko smithii, native to mainland Southeast Asia and Indonesia
 Gekko albomaculatus, found in Thailand and Malaysia